Charles P. Thompson (January 2, 1891 – October 26, 1979) was an American stage, film, and television actor. Best known for Asa on The Andy Griffith Show.

Career
Born in Philadelphia (Pennsylvania), Thompson began his career on Broadway in the 1920s. At age 57, he made his feature film debut as a ticket taker in The Naked City (1948).

During his television career, Thompson portrayed a janitor in the pilot episode, "The Return," of the series Window on Main Street in 1961 and played an old man on Gomer Pyle, U.S.M.C. in the episode "Love Letter to the Sarge" (1965). He also appeared as Doc Williams in Wanted Dead or Alive, two episodes of Gunsmoke, seven episodes of The Andy Griffith Show, and four episodes of Bonanza, one of which (1972) was his last appearance on screen. He played Asa Bascom on the Andy Griffith Show.

Death
Thompson died in 1979 at the age of 88 in Los Angeles, California.

Filmography

External links
 
 

1891 births
1979 deaths
Male actors from Pennsylvania
American male film actors
American male stage actors
American male television actors
20th-century American male actors